Making Babies may refer to:
 Making Babies (2001 film), a Swedish film
 Making Babies (2018 film), an American comedy film
 Making babies, or human reproduction